{{DISPLAYTITLE:C5H5N5O2}}
The molecular formula C5H5N5O2 (molar mass: 167.13 g/mol, exact mass: 67.0443) u may refer to:

 2,8-Dihydroxyadenine
 8-Oxoguanine (8-oxo-Gua)

Molecular formulas